John Bradley McKay (born June 8, 1948) was a politician in New Brunswick, Canada. He was a member of the province's legislative assembly and served as mayor of the city of Miramichi, New Brunswick from 2004 to 2008.

McKay was born in Newcastle, New Brunswick to William John McKay and Elmira F. McKay (née Scott). He attended the New Brunswick Teacher's College and the University of New Brunswick. He became a school teacher.

McKay was elected to the Legislature on November 18, 1974 to represent the Liberal in the new single-member riding of Miramichi-Newcastle. McKay was re-elected on October 23, 1978, and served four years as Financial Critic. McKay was mayor of Newcastle from 1986 to 1987. He was re-elected again on October 13, 1987, and on September 23, 1991. After a provincial redistribution abolished the old constituency, he was re-elected on September 11, 1995 to represent the Miramichi Centre from 1995 to 1999. He was speaker of the provincial assembly from 1996 to 1997. In 1999, he was defeated in a re-election bid by Progressive Conservative Kim Jardine.

Other
McKay has been past president of the Miramichi Historical Society, former director of the French Fort Cove Development Commission, former director of the Northumberland Organization of the Disabled and a member of the Newcastle Rotary Club.

Personal life
McKay is married to the former Sandra Murphy.

References

Sources
 Canadian Parliamentary Guide, 1997, Kathryn O'Handley;  

1948 births
Living people
New Brunswick Liberal Association MLAs
Speakers of the Legislative Assembly of New Brunswick
Mayors of Miramichi, New Brunswick